"Where Have All the Good Times Gone" is a song written by Ray Davies and performed by the Kinks. It was released as the B-side to "Till the End of the Day," and then on their album The Kink Kontroversy (1965 UK, 1966 US).

Cash Box described the single as a "raunchy, shufflin’ emotional tale of despair."

Ray Davies said, "We'd been rehearsing 'Where Have All the Good Times Gone' and our tour manager at the time, who was a lot older than us, said, 'That's a song a 40-year-old would write. I don't know where you get that from.' But I was taking inspiration from older people around me. I'd been watching them in the pubs, talking about taxes and job opportunities."

The song has since gained "classic" status and featured on numerous compilations. Pye Records released the track as a single in November 1973 (Pye 7N 45313 b/w "Lola"). This re-release failed to chart. Although the Kinks had performed the song live on the TV show Ready Steady Go! in 1965, it would not become a staple of their live shows until the 1970s.

The song was covered and released as a single in 1982 by Van Halen for their album Diver Down, reaching 17 on Billboard's Mainstream Rock chart.  The song has also been covered by David Bowie.

BrIrish pop band Supergrass covered the song many times live in concert from 1997-1999, and several live recordings of their versions exist.

Personnel 
According to band researcher Doug Hinman:

The Kinks
Ray Davies lead vocal, acoustic guitar
Dave Davies lead and backing vocals, electric guitar
Pete Quaife bass
Mick Avory drums

Additional musician
Nicky Hopkins piano

References

Sources

External links 
 [ Song review on Allmusic]

Songs about nostalgia
The Kinks songs
Van Halen songs
1965 songs
Song recordings produced by Shel Talmy
Songs written by Ray Davies
Pye Records singles
Reprise Records singles
1973 singles